The 2003 12 Hours of Sebring was the 51st running of this event, and took place on March 15, 2003.  This was also the opening race of the 2003 American Le Mans Series season.

Official results

Class winners in bold.  Cars failing to complete 70% of winner's distance marked as Not Classified (NC).

† - #30 was disqualified for receiving outside assistance while still on the race course.

Statistics
 Pole Position - #1 Infineon Team Joest - 1:48.826
 Note: #8 Team Bentley was originally on pole (1:48.108), but failed post-qualifying inspection.
 Fastest Lap - #7 Team Bentley - 1:49.521
 Distance - 
 Average Speed -

External links
 

S
12 Hours of Sebring
12 Hours of Sebring
12 Hours Of Sebring
12 Hours Of Sebring